Farm to Market Roads in Texas are owned and maintained by the Texas Department of Transportation (TxDOT).

RM 2400

Ranch to Market Road 2400 (RM 2400) is located in Pecos and Terrell counties.

On October 31, 1958, this route was extended northeast another . On September 27, 1960, this route was extended northeast another . On September 20, 1961, it was extended a further  eastward to its current eastern terminus.

Junction list

RM 2401

Ranch to Market Road 2401 (RM 2401) is located in Upton, Reagan and Glasscock counties.

RM 2401 begins at an intersection with SH 349 between Rankin and Midland. The highway runs eastward before turning north at County Road 126 just past RM 2594. RM 2401 runs north before turning towards the northeast at FM 3095 in Midkiff. The highway runs northeast and enters briefly enters Reagan County before entering Glasscock County near RM 1357. RM 2401 has an intersection with SH 137 between Stanton and Big Lake and continues to run for approximately another 11 miles before ending at RM 33 about 10 miles south of Garden City.

RM 2401 was originally designated as Farm to Market Road 2401 (FM 2401) on November 21, 1956, running from SH 349 to the Upton–Reagan county line. FM 2401 was re-designated as RM 2401 on November 26, 1969, and was extended eastward to RM 1357. On June 5, 1973, RM 2401 was extended to RM 1800, and the road was extended to RM 33 15 days later, bringing the highway to its current length and replacing FM 2874.

Junction list

FM 2402

FM 2403

Farm to Market Road 2403 (FM 2403) is located in Brazoria County.

FM 2403 begins at  FM 2917 near Liverpool. It travels to the northwest to  SH 35 (future SH 99) in southern Alvin. The route allows northbound (i.e., Houston-bound) truck traffic from the industrial plants located on FM 2917 to bypass Liverpool.

FM 2403 was designated on May 6, 1964, on its current route.

RM 2403 (1956)

The original RM 2403 was designated on November 21, 1956, from RM 33 west toward Iraan to the Pecos River. This designation was cancelled, as the road was designated as RM 1980 instead, and the next FM 2403 was designated.

FM 2403 (1957)

FM 2403 was designated on October 31, 1957, from US 81 north of Decatur northwest  to a road intersection. On September 27, 1960, the road was extended  to FM 1810. FM 2403 was cancelled on March 27, 1963, and transferred to FM 1810 when it was rerouted and extended.

FM 2404

Farm to Market Road 2404 (FM 2404) is located in Taylor and Jones counties. It runs from US 83 north of Abilene to FM 605.

FM 2404 was designated on October 2, 1959, from US 83 northwest to the Jones County line as a replacement for FM 1605. On November 24, 1959, the route was extended northwest to FM 605.

FM 2404 / RM 2404 (1956)

On October 31, 1957, the route was extended to the Glasscock County line, and the designation changed to Ranch to Market Road 2404 (RM 2404). RM 2404 was cancelled on December 2, 1958, and its mileage was transferred to RM 1800 (now SH 137).

FM 2405

FM 2406

FM 2407

FM 2408

FM 2409

FM 2410

Farm to Market Road 2410 (FM 2410) is located in Bell County. It runs 11 miles from Business US 190 and Martin Luther King Jr. Boulevard in Killeen through Knights Way In Harker Heights and ends in Belton at the corner of F.M. 2410 and Simmons Road.

FM 2410 was designated on November 21, 1956, from FM 439 east of Killeen to US 190 (later Loop 518, now BU 190-F). On October 31, 1958, the road was extended east  to a road intersection. On May 6, 1964, the road was extended east  to Simmons Road. On January 31, 2002, the section from FM 439 to BU 190-F became part of rerouted FM 439, while the section of FM 439 west of FM 2410 was removed from the state highway system or transferred to SH 195.

FM 2411

Farm to Market Road 2411 (FM 2411) is located in Dawson County. It runs from US 87 at Arvana to a point 3.2 miles east.

FM 2411 was designated on April 8, 1964, on the current route as a renumbering of FM 180.

FM 2411 (1956)

The original FM 2411 was designated on November 21, 1956, from FM 56 northeast of Cayote, east  to the Brazos River at Smiths Bend. On October 31, 1957, the road was extended east  to FM 1244 (now FM 933). On September 27, 1960, the road was extended east  to FM 1858/I-35 south of West. FM 2411 was cancelled on July 24, 1963, and transferred to FM 2114.

FM 2412

FM 2413

FM 2414

FM 2415

FM 2415 (1956)

The original FM 2415 was designated on November 21, 1956, from US 84 in Mexia, southeast  to the Freestone County line. FM 2415 was cancelled on November 27, 1957, and transferred to FM 1365.

FM 2416

FM 2417

FM 2418

FM 2419

FM 2420

FM 2421

FM 2422

FM 2423

RM 2424

Ranch to Market Road 2424 (RM 2424) is located in south Culberson County. RM 2424 begins at I-10 in Kent, and maintenance ends in south-eastern Culberson County, where it continues as Jones-Kent Road. It is the northern continuation of SH 118 which ends at Interstate 10. RM 2424 was first assigned in 1958 and was extended to its current route in 1959.

Ranch to Market Road 2424 begins at Interstate 10 in Kent. The road, known as Cessna Street, crosses the Union Pacific Railroad, and goes north through Kent. It runs parallel to the Kent Draw, intersecting with Iron Mountain Road at about the 5 mile mark. It continues northwest, crossing Hurds Pass Draw and intersecting with several ranch roads, before ending at Jones-Kent Road. The road continues as Jones-Kent Road. Road 2424 has the town's only store, Kent Mercantile, which includes a gas station. The mercantile store was closed in January 2011. The post office is still open, serving the nearby ranch community. There is only one family left in Kent.

RM 2424 was assigned on August 29, 1958, from U.S. Highway 80 (now Interstate 10) to Iron Mountain Road. The route was extended  to its current route on November 24, 1959.

FM 2424 (1956)

Farm to Market Road 2424 (FM 2424) was designated on November 21, 1956, as a route from FM 1638 northwest of Nacogdoches northwest  to Red Flat church. On October 31, 1957, FM 2424 was extended northwest  to FM 225. It was replaced by FM 343 on April 24, 1958.

FM 2425

FM 2425 (1956)

The original FM 2425 was designated on November 21, 1956, from US 59, 2.5 miles south of the Neches River, east  to Damascus Church. FM 2425 was cancelled on December 16, 1957, and transferred to FM 1987.

FM 2426

Farm to Market Road 2426 (FM 2426) is located in Sabine County, mainly within the Sabine National Forest. Its western terminus is at FM 1 in Pineland. Its eastern terminus is at SH 87 in the community of Yellowpine.

FM 2426 was designated on November 21, 1956, along its current route.

FM 2427

FM 2428

FM 2429

FM 2430

Farm to Market Road 2430 (FM 2430) is located in Bastrop County. It runs from FM 812 to the former Nike/Hercules Control Center.

FM 2430 was designated on June 28, 1963, on the current route.

FM 2430 (1956)

The original FM 2430 was designated on November 21, 1956, from US 75 (now I-45), 0.1 mile south of Halls Bayou, west to FM 149 (now SH 249). On December 10, 1959, the route of FM 2430 was transferred to FM 149 while a section of FM 149, from FM 2430 to US 75, was transferred to FM 2430. FM 2430 was cancelled on May 24, 1963, and removed from the highway system as FM 149 provided a more direct route for traffic than FM 2430.

FM 2431

FM 2432

Farm to Market Road 2432 (FM 2432) is located in Montgomery County. It runs from SH 75 in Willis to FM 1484 in Northeast Conroe.

FM 2432 was designated on November 21, 1956, on its current route.

FM 2433

FM 2434

FM 2435

FM 2435 (1956)

FM 2435 was cancelled six months later and transferred to FM 884.

FM 2435 (1957)

On May 6, 1964, the road was extended north  to the Tarrant County line. FM 2435 was cancelled on December 20, 1984, by district request and transferred to FM 2331.

FM 2436

FM 2437

FM 2438

Farm to Market Road 2438 (FM 2438) is located in Guadalupe County.

FM 2438 begins at an intersection with US 90A between Seguin and Belmont. The highway travels in a generally northern direction before ending at an intersection with US 90 in Kingsbury.

The highway was extended  to US 90A on July 11, 1968.

Junction list

FM 2438 (1956)

The highway was cancelled and removed from the state highway system on October 31, 1958, as the base closed down.

FM 2439

Farm to Market Road 2439 (FM 2439) is located in Hays and Comal counties.

FM 2439 begins at an intersection with FM 1102 near the community of Hunter. The highway travels in a northeast direction along Hunter Road and enters San Marcos near several major retail centers, including a Tanger Outlet Center. FM 2439 ends at RM 12.

FM 2439 was designated on November 21, 1956, from RM 12 (later SH 80, now Moore Street) to FM 1102. On January 26, 2017, the section north of RM 12 was given to the city of San Marcos, as well as the section of SH 80 west of Loop 82.

Junction list

FM 2440

FM 2441

FM 2442

FM 2443

FM 2444

FM 2445

FM 2446

FM 2447

Farm to Market Road 2447 (FM 2447) is located in Washington County. It runs from US 290 west of Chappell Hill, east and northeast via Chappell Hill a distance of 8.4 miles.

FM 2447 was designated on November 21, 1956, on the current route as a replacement of a section of FM 1155.

FM 2448

Farm to Market Road 2448 (FM 2448) is located in southwestern Reeves County. It connects I-10 east of Balmorhea northward to SH 17 northeast of Saragosa. The road has no major intersections other than its termini.

The two-lane road proceeds to the north across gentle terrain in a straight path for  turning only to intersect SH 17 at its northern terminus northeast of Saragosa. The road provides a more direct connection between points northward on SH 17 with points eastward on I-10 than SH 17 through Saragosa that intersects I-10  to the west.

The current FM 2448 was designated on January 29, 1959.

FM 2448 (1956)

FM 2448 was designated on November 21, 1956, as a route in Collin County from the former route of FM 544 northward  to Bethany. The road was extended north  to SH 121 on September 27, 1957. That route was added as an extension to FM 2478 on November 28, 1958, and that portion of FM 2478 was removed from the state highway system and given to the city of Plano for maintenance on October 28, 1987.

FM 2449

FM 2450

FM 2451

FM 2452

FM 2453

FM 2454

FM 2455

FM 2456

FM 2457

Farm to Market Road 2457 (FM 2457) is located in Polk County. It runs from Lake Livingston east to US 190.

FM 2457 was designated on March 31, 1970, on the current route as a replacement of a section of US 190.

FM 2457 (1956)

The original FM 2457 was designated on November 21, 1956, from FM 1999, 1.3 miles east of Leigh, north  to Caddo Lake. FM 2457 was cancelled on August 5, 1968, and became a portion of FM 9.

FM 2458

Farm to Market Road 2458 (FM 2458) is located in Garza County.

FM 2458 begins at an intersection with US 84 in Justiceburg. The highway travels in an eastern direction just north of Lake Alan Henry, turning to the north at an intersection with FM 3519. FM 2458 runs in a northern direction near the Lake Alan Henry Lodges before the route becomes more rural. State maintenance for the highway ends at County Road 345.

The highway was extended  eastward and northward on June 28, 1963.

Junction list

FM 2458 (1956)

The highway was extended  northwestward on October 31, 1957. This FM 2458 was cancelled on December 1, 1958, with the mileage being transferred to FM 943.

FM 2458 (1959)

The highway was cancelled on October 18, 1961, with the mileage being transferred to FM 779.

FM 2459

FM 2459 (1956)

The original FM 2459 was designated on November 21, 1956, from FM 834, 2.8 miles northwest of Hull, north  to FM 162 (now SH 105). FM 2459 was cancelled eleven months later and removed from the highway system as the county could not acquire the right of way; FM 1410 was extended instead.

FM 2460

FM 2461

FM 2462

RM 2462 (1956)

The original RM 2462 was designated on November 21, 1956, from SH 118 near Study Butte west  to a road intersection near Terlingua. On October 31, 1957, the road was extended west  to the Presidio County line. RM 2462 was cancelled on February 19, 1960, and transferred to FM 170.

FM 2462 (1960)

FM 2462 was cancelled on September 16, 1963, and transferred to FM 2665.

RM 2463

FM 2463 (1957)

The first use of the FM 2463 designation was in Erath County, from SH 108 northwest of Huckabay northeast  to Liberty Church. FM 2463 was cancelled on October 3, 1961, and transferred to FM 1715 (now FM 1188).

FM 2463 (1962)

The second use of the FM 2463 designation was in Floyd County, from FM 378, 3 miles south of FM 788, east  to FM 207. FM 2463 was cancelled on September 16, 1968, and became a portion of FM 2286.

FM 2464

FM 2465

FM 2466

FM 2467

FM 2468

FM 2468 (1956)

FM 2468 was cancelled eleven months later and removed from the state highway system in exchange for the creation of FM 2531.

FM 2468 (1958)

The next use of the FM 2468 designation was in Carson County, from FM 294 at White Deer west  to a road intersection. FM 2468 was cancelled on December 31, 1959, and transferred to FM 2385.

RM 2469

Ranch to Market Road 2469 (RM 2469) is located in northern Irion County.

The route travels to the east through unincorporated Irion County; the only intersections are with county roads. RM 2469 provides access to Ketchum Mountain and the Ketchum Oil Field. The highway then curves to the southeast and crosses Lopez Creek, whose source lies just south of the roadway. It then enters the county seat of Mertzon along Oak Avenue, reaching its eastern terminus at  US 67.

RM 2469 is two lanes for its entire length. Shoulders are present only near the termini.

RM 2469 is the second Texas route to bear that number.

The current RM 2469 was established on October 31, 1958. Its eastern terminus has always been at US 67 in Mertzon. The final extension to SH 163 occurred on June 28, 1963.

FM 2469 (1956)

Farm to Market Road 2469 (FM 2469) was designated on November 21, 1956, and connected north and east  from US 70 near Ogden in Cottle County. That designation was removed on October 31, 1957, in exchange for the creation of FM 2532.

FM 2470

FM 2471

FM 2472

FM 2472 (1956)

On October 1, 1957, the road was extended south  to SH 86. FM 2472 was cancelled on December 14, 1959, and transferred to FM 657; FM 2472 was reassigned to the old route of FM 657.

FM 2473

FM 2474

FM 2475

FM 2475 (1956)

The original FM 2475 was designated on November 21, 1956, from SH 114 north of Bridgeport southwest  to Lake Bridgeport. FM 2475 was extended west to FM 1156 on September 27, 1957, and was redesignated as RM 2475.

RM 2475

RM 2475 was designated on September 27, 1957, from SH 114 north of Bridgeport southwest and west  to FM 1156 west of Wizard Wells as an extension and redesignation of FM 2475. On June 4, 1964, a  section from FM 1156 at Vineyard to FM 1156 was transferred to SH 824. The remainder of RM 2475 (as well as SH 824) was cancelled on October 1, 1968, and transferred to SH 24 (now US 380).

FM 2476

FM 2476 (1956)

The original FM 2476 was designated on November 21, 1956, from FM 270 (now FM 69) near Blackoak south  to FM 1483 (now FM 69) at Coke. FM 2476 was cancelled on December 21, 1959, and transferred to FM 69.

FM 2477

FM 2477 (1956)

The first use of the FM 2477 designation was in Tarrant County, from US 287 near Mansfield south  to the Johnson County line. FM 2447 was cancelled four months later and transferred to FM 917.

FM 2477 (1957)

The next use of the FM 2477 designation was in Hood and Parker counties, from FM 4, 4 miles east of Lipan, northeast and north   to a road intersection 1 mile south of Dennis. FM 2477 was cancelled on December 15, 1959, and transferred to FM 1543.

FM 2478

Farm to Market Road 2478 (FM 2478) is located in Collin County. It serves the cities of Frisco, McKinney, Prosper, Celina, and Weston.

FM 2448 was combined and canceled, adding . The current FM 2478 northern terminus is at FM 455, and its southern terminus is at SH 121/Sam Rayburn Tollway. FM 2478 is currently known as Custer Rd and is a major road and serves as a border for many cities on most of its route (Frisco/McKinney, McKinney/Prosper, McKinney/Celina, and Celina/Weston.)

Junction list

FM 2479

RM 2479 (1956)

RM 2479 was cancelled on May 22, 1958, as the county was unable to secure right of way for the route.

RM 2479 (1958)

RM 2479 was cancelled on October 9, 1961, and transferred to RM 2084.

FM 2480

Farm to Market Road 2480 (FM 2480) is located in Cameron County.

The southern terminus of FM 2480 is in Los Fresnos at  FM 1847, which provides access from the northern suburbs of Cameron County to Brownsville's central business district. The route travels northeast along Old Port Road before turning to the north along San Roman Road. The FM 2480 designation ends at  FM 510 in Bayview.

The northern extension to FM 510 was added on October 31, 1957.

FM 2481

FM 2481 (1956)

The original FM 2481 was designated on October 31, 1957, from SH 92 at Hamlin north  to the Stonewall County line. FM 2481 was cancelled on November 5, 1958, and transferred to FM 1835.

FM 2482

FM 2483

FM 2484

FM 2485

FM 2485 (1956)

The original FM 2485 was designated on October 31, 1957, from SH 320, 5 miles northeast of Lott, southeast  to a road intersection. FM 2485 was cancelled on October 14, 1960, and transferred to FM 2027.

FM 2486

FM 2487

FM 2487 (1956)

The original FM 2487 was designated on October 31, 1957, from FM 1244 (now FM 933), 1.5 miles south of Aquilla, southwest  to FM 2411 (now FM 2114). FM 2487 was cancelled on October 9, 1961, and transferred to FM 1304.

FM 2488

FM 2489

FM 2490

FM 2491

Farm to Market Road 2491 (FM 2491) is located in McLennan County. The road begins at Loop 340, which loops in Waco. The road then goes northeast, splits into FM 2957 which eventually leads to FM 2491 ending at Double Ee Ranch Road. The road continues on to FM 939 between McLennan and Limestone counties.

FM 2491 was designated on October 31, 1957, from SH 6 east to a road intersection. On May 22, 1959, the road was revised to begin at Loop 232 (now Loop 340).

FM 2492

FM 2492 (1957)

The original FM 2492 was designated on October 31, 1957, from SH 294 at Slocum southeast 5.6 miles to the Houston County line. FM 2492 was cancelled 11 months later and transferred to FM 2022.

FM 2493

Farm to Market Road 2493 (FM 2493) is located in far north-central Cherokee County and south-central Smith County. It is known locally as Houston Street in Bullard and Old Jacksonville Highway in Tyler.

On June 27, 1995, the section of the road from Gresham to Tyler was designated Urban Road 2493 (UR 2493). The designation reverted to FM 2493 with the elimination of the Urban Road system on November 15, 2018.

Junction list

FM 2494

FM 2495

Farm to Market Road 2495 (FM 2495) is located in Henderson County.

FM 2495 begins at an intersection with SH 31 and runs in an eastern direction along Flat Creek Road. The highway has an interchange with US 175 / Loop 7 and turns north at Lake Athens. FM 2495 leaves the Athens city limits north of the lake and ends at an intersection with FM 317.

The highway was extended  to FM 317 on June 1, 1965.

Junction list

FM 2496

FM 2497

FM 2498

FM 2499

Farm to Market Road 2499 (FM 2499) runs from SH 121/SH 26 in Grapevine, near the north entrance of DFW Airport, to I-35E in Denton.

FM 2499 begins at an interchange with SH 121/SH 26 near Grapevine Mills, just north of DFW Airport. The highway runs about a mile east of Lake Grapevine, before entering the city of Flower Mound. FM 2499 runs through Flower Mound as Long Prairie Road south of FM 407, before becoming Village Parkway. The highway runs through Highland Village, passing FM 2181 in Corinth, where the highway becomes Barrel Strap Road. The highway then intersects State School Road and becomes State School Road, and ends at I-35E.

The current FM 2499 was designated on September 27, 1960, running from FM 1171 south to the Denton-Tarrant county line. The highway was extended further south to SH 121 on November 29, 1982. This extension of FM 2499 ran across the Grapevine Lake dam and through the lake's spillway. FM 2499 was extended north to FM 407 on October 26, 1983. On April 27, 1988, the extension to SH 121 was redescribed as going from north of the county line to SH 121.  Due to urban growth and the inability to widen the road across the dam (plus the need, during flood incidents, to close the road across the spillway), the road was re-routed to the east in its current configuration on April 27, 1988. Also, the old route of FM 2499 south of the Denton-Tarrant county line was cancelled, and this portion was permanently closed, as it was inundated by Lake Grapevine. However, the old route of FM 2499 north of the Denton-Tarrant county line was still part of FM 2499, creating a split in FM 2499. On May 29, 1991, an extension north to Loop 288 was designated. On April 28, 1994, the old route of FM 2499 to the Denton-Tarrant county line was cancelled, eliminating the split in FM 2499. The extension to FM 2181 opened in 2010 along Village Parkway through Highland Village, ending at FM 2181 in Corinth. The extension to Robinson Road opened on December 18, 2017. An extension to I-35E opened on March 12, 2018. A new traffic light at Robinson Road was added by June 2018. Landscaping on the new section is under construction. The extension to I-35E was finally designated on December 10, 2020. The eventual plan is to reroute Loop 288 south on new construction, along part of FM 2499 to just south of Robinson Road, and then southwest along new construction (right-of-way has already been acquired for this section) to FM 2181. Existing Loop 288 southwest to I-35E will be redesignated as Spur 288. FM 2499 will be truncated to end at Loop 288.

The entire highway was redesignated Urban Road 2499 (UR 2499) on June 27, 1995. The designation reverted to FM 2499 with the elimination of the Urban Road system on November 15, 2018.

Junction list

FM 2499 (1957)

On December 18, 1959, the highway was cancelled and transferred to FM 1733.

Notes

References

+24
Farm to market roads 2400
Farm to Market Roads 2400